These are the international rankings of Honduras.

International rankings

See also

References

Honduras